Axel Matias Haglund (16 December 1884 – 21 February 1948) was a Finnish rower. He competed in the men's single sculls event at the 1912 Summer Olympics.

References

1884 births
1948 deaths
Finnish male rowers
Olympic rowers of Finland
Rowers at the 1912 Summer Olympics
Sportspeople from Helsinki
20th-century Finnish people